The Tchaikovsky House in Taganrog is a historical mansion in the historical downtown Taganrog on Ulitsa Grecheskaya, 56. The mansion was built in early 1870s by the project of the architect Petrov. It was owned by the merchant Sarandino until mid-1890s. 

From 1883 until 1894, the building was rented by the captain of the first rank Ippolit Tchaikovsky who served in Taganrog representing the Russian Society of navigation and trade. Pyotr Tchaikovsky came to Taganrog and stayed at this house three times: in 1886, 1888 and in 1890. 

The building was mentioned in one of Anton Chekhov's letters to his cousin Georgy Chekhov in 1895: If I were rich, I would certainly buy the house where Ippolit Tchaikovsky used to live.

The mansion was damaged during the 1927 Crimean earthquakes and as consequence, the left wing was demolished.

In 1975 the music department of the Chekhov Library and the concert hall moved into the building. A memorial room, where Pyotr Tchaikovsky stayed was transformed into a small museum dedicated to Tchaikovsky family and their relations with Anton Chekhov. The museum was inaugurated on May 1, 1976. 

In 2009-2010 started a major renovation of the building, which was aimed at reconstruction of the original design the way it was in late 19th century, thus removing the weather vane which was placed around 1976/1977 and which was too heavy for the old building.

External links and references

 А.А.Овчинникова "Дом Чайковских" в "Вехи Таганрога. Историко-литературный альманах" №41-42, стр. 51-53

Buildings and structures in Taganrog
Libraries in Russia
Cultural heritage monuments in Taganrog
Cultural heritage monuments of regional significance in Rostov Oblast